The 1999–2000 Ligat Nashim was the second season of women's league football under the Israeli Football Association.

The league was won by ASA Tel Aviv University.

League table

7 matches remained unplayed at the close of the season.

Top scorers

References
1999-2000 season Israeli Women's Football (via Internet Archive)
Israel (Women) 1999/00 rsssf.com

Ligat Nashim seasons
1999–2000 in Israeli women's football
women
Israel